Aleksandr Kirov (born 4 September 1984, in Astana) is a retired Kazakh footballer who primarily played left back.

Career statistics

International

Statistics accurate as of match played 4 June 2013

References

External links
 

Living people
1984 births
Kazakhstani footballers
Association football defenders
Kazakhstan under-21 international footballers
Kazakhstan international footballers
Kazakhstan Premier League players
FC Astana players
FC Aktobe players
FC Shakhter Karagandy players
FC Zhetysu players
FC Taraz players